Linden Rowat (born June 27, 1989) is a Canadian major junior ice hockey goaltender. He most recently played for the University of Alberta during the 2010-11 season. Rowat was selected by the Los Angeles Kings in the fifth round (124th overall) of the 2007 NHL Entry Draft.

Playing career
Rowat began his major junior career with the Regina Pats of the WHL in 2005–06, posting a 3.13 goals against average (GAA) in a 26-game rookie season. The following year, in 2006–07, he assumed the starting position with Regina and recorded a 25-18-7 record with a 2.87 GAA and .897 save percentage. In the off-season, he was drafted 124th overall by the Los Angeles Kings in the 2007 NHL Entry Draft. Returning to Regina for a third WHL season, he turned in a 2.68 GAA and .904 save percentage season to earn himself WHL East First All-Star Team honours.

Awards and honours

References

External links

1989 births
Alberta Golden Bears ice hockey players
Canadian ice hockey goaltenders
Ice hockey people from Alberta
Lethbridge Hurricanes players
Living people
Los Angeles Kings draft picks
Ontario Reign (ECHL) players
People from Cochrane, Alberta
Regina Pats players